Harris Whitbeck Cain is CNN's International Correspondent based in Mexico City, Mexico. He covers key events in Latin America and around the world for CNN Worldwide, including CNN International, CNN en Español, and CNN/U.S.

Since joining CNN in 1991, Whitbeck has reported on worldwide events including the war in Iraq and its aftermath, the U.S.-led war against the Taliban in Afghanistan, the 2004 Haitian coup d'état, the rebellion in Chiapas, several papal visits to Latin America and the hostage crisis at the Japanese embassy in Lima. He also covered September 11's terrorist attack against The Pentagon, in Washington, D.C. He reported extensively from Turkey and Jordan before the war in Iraq and most recently he reported post war events from Iraq where he was part of the team of reporters who first broke the news of the death of Saddam Hussein's sons.

In Latin America, Whitbeck has covered important developments on political, economic and social arenas as well as numerous devastations caused by natural disasters. Among those, Whitbeck covered floods in Venezuela, the earthquake in Colombia and destruction left by Hurricane Mitch. On the political side, Whitbeck reported on the presidential elections in Mexico, Peru and Argentina, the Augusto Pinochet extradition process, the coup attempt in Ecuador, the death of Octavio Paz and Bill Clinton's trip to Latin America in May 1997. He also reported on the Latin American Summit from Monterrey, Mexico.

Whitbeck has received various journalism accolades such as the National Headliner Award for coverage of the Ciudad Juárez killings in 1999, and two others for his special report on the presence of Middle Eastern terror organizations in South America's Triple Borders region, comprising Brazil, Argentina and Paraguay in 2001. He won the Global Media Award, given by the Population Institute; and the Environmentalist Media Award, from the Association of Environmental Media. He also received a special Emmy recognition for his journalistic achievements. In addition, Whitbeck was selected one of the 12 leaders in the International Journalism category for 2001 by Guatemala's Business Council.

A native of Guatemala, Whitbeck holds a bachelor's degree in international studies from Washington College in Chestertown, Maryland, and a master's degree in journalism from Columbia University in New York City. He is fluent in English, French and Spanish.

Harris Whitbeck was the host of the first 3 seasons of the Latin American version of the reality show The Amazing Race. The first two seasons aired on Discovery Channel Latin America, under the name The Amazing Race en Discovery Channel. The third season aired on September 25, 2011 on Space.

External links
 Biography
 Biography (in Spanish)

Guatemalan journalists
Male journalists
Living people
1965 births
CNN people
Washington College alumni
Columbia University Graduate School of Journalism alumni